The Township of Elm Springs is one of thirty-seven townships in Washington County, Arkansas, USA. As of the 2000 census, its total population was 1,912.

Geography
It was cut from Clear Creek Township in 1852. By 1920 Elm Springs Township had given part to Harmon Township and Litteral Township.

Cities, towns, villages
Elm Springs

Cemeteries
 Elm Springs Cemetery

Major routes
 U.S. Highway 412 (formerly AR 68)
 Highway 112

References

External links
 United States Census Bureau 2008 TIGER/Line Shapefiles
 United States National Atlas
 US-Counties.com
 City-Data.com

Townships in Washington County, Arkansas
Populated places established in 1852
Townships in Arkansas
1852 establishments in Arkansas